Trying To Write A Love Song is Sherry Rich's second EP, released in 1996

Background

Rich essentially assembled the same line-up of musicians who recorded her first EP, to lay down the tracks for her second EP Trying To Write A Love Song. Nick Grant replaced former Grievous Angel Steve Connolly, who had died in 1995 (this EP was dedicated to his memory). Tracks were recorded during winter of 1995, at Melbourne's Atlantis Studios.

Track listing
 Trying To Write A Love Song  
 Sitting Here Alone (Country Star's Lament) 
 That's What I Like
 Dark End Of The Street

Release history

Produced by former Divinyls bass player Tim Millikan, this EP also features guest musicians Adam Gare and Garrett Costigan.

Personnel

Grievous Angels
 Sherry Rich - lead vocals, guitar
 Doug Lee Robertson - bass and backing vocals
 Steve Morrison - drums
 Nick Grant - lead guitar
 Matt Heydon - keyboards

Guest Musicians
 Adam Gare - fiddle on 'Trying To Write A Love Song'
 Garrett Costigan - pedal steel on 'Sitting Here Alone'

Production
 Tim Millikan - producer
 David McCluney - engineer

References

1994 EPs
Sherry Rich albums